Nicole Goehring (born September 25, 1976) is a Canadian politician representing the constituency of Edmonton-Castle Downs in the Legislative Assembly of Alberta.

Political career
She was appointed to the role of Government of Alberta's Liaison to the Canadian Armed Forces shortly after being sworn in on May 24, 2015. Goehring was responsible for developing, supporting, promoting and sustaining government's relationship with the Canadian Armed Forces.

Goehring was also appointed to the Edmonton Salutes Committee. This committee works collaboratively to support the military community in and around Edmonton.

In the 29th Legislature (2015-2019) she served as chair of the Standing Committee on Families and Communities and of the Standing Committee on Resource Stewardship, and as a member of the Standing Committee on Privileges and Elections and the Standing Orders and Printing, the Special Standing Committee on Members’ Services, the Standing Committee on Public Accounts and the Standing Committee on Families and Communities.

Following her re-election in 2019 she was appointed  by Rachel Notley as the Official Opposition critic for Culture and Military Liaison.

In the 30th Legislature, she serves as the deputy chair of the Standing Committee on Alberta's Economic Future, and as a member of the Special Standing Committee on Members' Services, the Select Special Child and Youth Advocate Search Committee, and the Select Special Ombudsman and Public Interest Commissioner Search Committee.

Personal life
Prior to serving with the Legislative Assembly, Goehring worked for close to a decade with Child and Family Services in various capacities, including as a caseworker, assessor and, most recently, as a court co-ordinator. Previous to this, she worked with Edmonton Integrated Services for seven years, six of which she spent in the role of group home supervisor.

From 1996 to 1997, Goehring worked as a peers educating peers coordinator for TERRA Association, a program she co-created and implemented in schools, hospitals and universities to provide community education in the area of teen pregnancy. From 1995 to 1996 she was a youth mediator with Community and Family Services. At that time she co-created and implemented a youth friendly mediation manual and program, and worked with Edmonton school counselors and Edmonton police officers to mediate youth related situations in schools and communities to avoid suspensions, expulsion and or criminal charges.

An active parent, she has managed sports teams, has worked on parent advisory committees and has acted as a parent liaison.

Electoral record

2019 general election

2015 general election

References

1976 births
Alberta New Democratic Party MLAs
Living people
Politicians from Edmonton
Women MLAs in Alberta
21st-century Canadian politicians
21st-century Canadian women politicians